Großhadern (in the town district Hadern) is a district in the south-west of the Bavarian state capital Munich. Großhadern is primarily a bourgeois residential area. Exceptions are the so-called "village core" with numerous small shops as well as the university district around the Klinikum Großhadern. This includes several student halls and three football fields. The number of restaurants and beer gardens is also remarkably high. In the south-west of Großhadern, between the subway station "Klinikum Großhadern" and the adjacent forest, a new settlement is being built on a former field with owned and rented apartments as well as some shops. Many of the houses are already finished and lived in.
The old church of St. Peter (built in 1315, renovated in the 17th century) is located in the village center, not far from it, the parish church of St. Canisius, built in 1925, with the Stations of the Cross by Kaspar Schleibner. The Protestant church has its home in the Reformation Memorial Church.
A large part of the Großhadern area is in the south-west of the Waldfriedhof.

Publicity 
 
Großhadern is known for:
 TSV Munich Großhadern, which has made a name for itself in Judo (Olympic support basis, with numerous international successes)
 Klinikum Großhadern of the Ludwig Maximilian University of Munich and adjoining High-Tech Campus (Uni.)
 Hadern village fete
 Heiglhoftheater

Location 
Großhadern is located southwest of the city center. The following are adjacent districts:

 Laim
 Forstenried
 Fürstenried
 Pasing
 Gräfelfing
 Sendling-Westpark
 Martinsried
 Neuried
 Kleinhadern
 Neuhadern
 Blumenau

History 
On 1 April 1938, the largely independent municipality of Großhadern was integrated into the city of Munich.

Traffic Connections

Highway 
 A96, exit Blumenau / Großhadern

Subway 
 Line U6: Großhadern, Klinikum Großhadern

Bus 
 Metro Bus line 54: 4 stops
 Metro bus line 56: 7 stops
 City Bus line 167: 8 stops
 Regional bus line 266: 4 stops
 Regional bus line 268: 7 stops
 Regional bus line 269: 2 stops

References 

Quarters of Munich
Former municipalities in Bavaria